Barrington J. Bayley (9 April 1937  – 14 October 2008) was an English science fiction writer.

Biography
Bayley was born in Birmingham, England, and educated in Newport, Shropshire. He worked a number of jobs before joining the Royal Air Force during 1955; his first published story, "Combat's End", had been printed the year before in Vargo Statten Magazine.

During the late 1950s, Bayley became friends and a frequent collaborator with Michael Moorcock on features, comics and short stories, chiefly for Fleetway Publications where he was also a regular writer of text stories, some of which have recently been reprinted by Rebellion Books. He later wrote sf stories for New Worlds magazine and Moorcock, who described himself as "the dumb one in the partnership". He, Moorcock and J.G.Ballard met regularly and their discussions and theories led to the development of  science fiction's New Wave. His short stories featured regularly in New Worlds and then later in various New Worlds paperback anthologies. His first book, The Star Virus, was followed by more than a dozen other novels; his downbeat, gloomy themes have been cited as influential on the likes of  M. John Harrison, William S. Burroughs, Brian Stableford, Bruce Sterling, Iain Banks and Alastair Reynolds.

Bayley, who came to live at Donnington, Telford, died of complications from bowel cancer on 14 October 2008. During 2001, he had written an outline for a sequel to Eye of Terror, provisionally titled An Age of Adventure. The novel was unreleased at the time of his death but rumours and listings of copies have circulated, including claims of a 2002 release date and a page count of 288. The book still makes appearances in lists of his works, including the bibliography in the ebooks of Bayley's works released by the Gollancz SF Gateway. His literary estate is managed by Michael Moorcock.

Works
Bayley used the pseudonyms S. Barrington Bayley, P.F Woods, J. Barrington Bayley, Alan Aumbry, Michael Barrington, Simon Barclay, and John Diamond.

Novels

Collections

Short stories

 "Combat's End" (aka "Cosmic Combatants") (1954)
 "Cold Death" (1955)
 "Last Post" (1955)
 "Kindly Travellers" (1955)
 "The Bargain" (1955)
 "Martyrs Appointed" (1955)
 "Fugitive" (1956)
 "The Reluctant Death" (1956)
 "Consolidation" (1959)
 "Peace on Earth" (with Michael Moorcock) (1959)
 "The Tank" (1961)
 "The Radius Riders" (1962)
 "Double Time" (1962)
 "The Big Sound" (1962)
 "The Ship That Sailed the Ocean of Space" (aka "Fishing Trip") (1962)
 "Solo Flight" (1963)
 "Flux" (with Michael Moorcock) (1963)
 "Natural Defence" (1963)
 "Return Visit" (1963)
 "Farewell, Dear Brother" (1964)
 "The Countenance" (1964)
 "Integrity" (1964)
 "The Star Virus" (1964)
 "The Patch" (1964)
 "All the King's Men" (1965)
 "The Ship of Disaster" (1965)
 "Reactionary" (1965)
 "Catspaw" (1965)
 "A Taste of the Afterlife" (with Charles Platt) (1966)
 "Aid to Nothing" (1967)
 "The Four-Color Problem" (1971)
 "Exit From City 5" (1971)
 "Man in Transit" (1972)
 "The Exploration of Space" (1972)
 "The Seed of Evil" (1973)
 "Mutation Planet" (1973)
 "An Overload" (1973)	
 "Me and My Antronoscope" (1973)
 "Maladjustment" (1974)
 "The Bees of Knowledge" (1975)
 "The Cabinet of Oliver Naylor" (1976)
 "The Problem of Morley's Emission" (1978)
 "Rome Vindicated" (1978)
 "Sporting with the Chid" (1979)
 "Life Trap" (1979)
 "Perfect Love" (1979)
 "The Infinite Searchlight" (1979)
 "Wizard Wazo's Revenge" (1979)
 "The God Gun" (1979)
 "The Forever Racket" (1980)
 "The Ur-Plant" (1983)
 "Escapist Literature" (1985)
 "When They Asked Him What Happens" (1988)
 "Death Ship" (1989)
 "Cling to the Curvature!" (1989)
 "Tommy Atkins" (1989)
 "The Death of Arlett" (1989)
 "The Phobeya" (with Sean Bayley) (1990)
 "Galimatias" (1990)
 "Culture Shock" (1990)
 "Light" (1991)		
 "The Remembrance" (1991)
 "Don't Leave Me" (1992)
 "Doctor Pinter in the Mythology Isles" (1992)
 "Why Live? Dream!" (1992)
 "Quiddity Wars" (1992)
 "Teatray in the Sky" (1992)
 "This Way into the Wendy House" (1993)
 "Love in Backspace" (1994)
 "Gnostic Endings: Flight to the Hypercosmos" (1994)
 "On the Ledge" (1994)
 "Get Out of Here" (1995)
 "Duel Among the Wine Green Suns" (with Michael Moorcock) (1995)
 "The Island of Dr. Romeau" (1995)
 "A Crab Must Try" (1996)
 "The Crear" (1996)
 "Children of the Emperor" (Warhammer 40K) (1998)
 "The Lives of Ferag Lion-Wolf" (Warhammer 40K) (1999)
 "The Sky Tower" (2000)
 "Battle of the Archeosaurs" (Warhammer 40K) (2000)
 "Planet of the Stercorasaurs" (2000)
 "Hive Fleet Horror" (Warhammer 40K) (2000)
 "The Worms of Hess" (2000)
 "The Revolt of the Mobiles" (2000)
 "It Was a Lover and His Lass" (2001)
 "Domie" (2001)
 "The Multiplex Fixative" (2003)
 "Party Smart Card" (2006)
 "Formic Gender Disorder" (2008)

References

External links

 Astounding World of Barrington J. Bayley Fan Site
 Annihilation Factotum Overview by Rhys Hughes
 Three Stories by Barrington Bayley - The Infinite Searchlight, The God Gun and Mutation Planet hosted online with the author's permission
 

1937 births
2008 deaths
20th-century British novelists
20th-century English male writers
21st-century British novelists
21st-century English male writers
British male novelists
Deaths from colorectal cancer
English science fiction writers
People educated at Adams' Grammar School
People from Birmingham, West Midlands